Kjetil Mørland (born 3 October 1980), better known as simply Mørland, is a Norwegian singer and songwriter. He represented Norway in the Eurovision Song Contest 2015 along with Debrah Scarlett with his song "A Monster Like Me".

Career
Mørland fronted the band Absent Elk from its 2008 inception, releasing the album Caught in the Headlights in the spring of 2009. The band supported The Script, The Hoosiers and Girls Aloud on UK tours before going on to tour the UK themselves in June 2009.

In 2015 Mørland wrote "A Monster Like Me", and performed it at Melodi Grand Prix as a duet with Debrah Scarlett. They won the competition with 88,869 votes and represented  in the Eurovision Song Contest 2015 in Vienna. The duo performed in the second semi-final and qualified to the final on 23 May 2015, in which they placed 8th.

In January 2018, he was credited as the writer and producer of Melodi Grand Prix 2018 entry "Who We Are" performed by 19 year old singer Rebecca. The song competed at the Oslo Spektrum on 10 March 2018, and finished in 2nd place behind the eventual winner Alexander Rybak.

Mørland returned to Melodi Grand Prix as an artist in 2019, with the self-written song "En livredd mann". The song competed in the final in Oslo Spektrum on 2 March 2019, but did not advance from the first round. In the same contest, he was also credited as a writer of Adrian Jørgensen song "Bubble", alongside Jonas McDonnell and Aleksander Walmann. The song placed second behind Keiino song "Spirit in the Sky".

In February 2020, he was credited as a writer and composer of the song "Attention" by Ulrikke Brandstorp, alongside Brandstorp herself and Christian Ingebrigtsen. The song competed in the grand final of Melodi Grand Prix 2020 at Trondheim Spektrum on 15 February 2020, winning with 200,345 votes, and was therefore selected to represent  in the Eurovision Song Contest 2020 in Rotterdam. However, on 18 March 2020, the event was cancelled due to the COVID-19 pandemic.

In 2021 he returned once again to Melodi Grand Prix as a songwriter alongside Ingebritsen and singer Rein Alexander with the song "Eyes Wide Open" which qualified automatically for the final celebrated on 20 February 2021. The song failed to qualify to the Gold Final thus, it stayed out of the competition.

In 2022 it was announced that he is taking part as a co-writer and producer in Eesti Laul 2023 for "House Of Glass" performed by Janek (Janek Valgepea).

Discography

Studio albums

Extended plays

Singles

Songwriting credits

See also
 Norway in the Eurovision Song Contest 2015

References

External links

Eurovision Song Contest entrants of 2015
Eurovision Song Contest entrants for Norway
1980 births
Norwegian pop singers
People from Grimstad
Living people
Melodi Grand Prix contestants
Melodi Grand Prix winners
Melodi Grand Prix composers
Norwegian expatriates in the United Kingdom
21st-century Norwegian singers
21st-century Norwegian male singers